Coyote Dam is a  high,  long, earth and rock dam built in 1936 in Santa Clara County, California, United States, located north of Gilroy.

It impounds the 635 acre 3.5 mile long Coyote Lake (also known as Coyote Reservoir).  The Santa Clara Valley Water District owns the dam.

See also
Coyote Lake
List of dams and reservoirs in California
List of lakes in the San Francisco Bay Area

References

Buildings and structures in Santa Clara County, California
Dams in California
United States local public utility dams
Dams completed in 1936